The 2011–12 Boston Bruins season was the Bruins' 88th season in the National Hockey League (NHL). The Bruins entered the 2011–12 season as the defending Stanley Cup champions.

Off-season
Veteran forward Mark Recchi retired. Forward Michael Ryder went to the Dallas Stars via free agency, and defenseman Tomas Kaberle went to the Carolina Hurricanes. Forward Benoit Pouliot was signed.

Regular season
The Bruins' opened the regular season with a home loss to the Philadelphia Flyers, whom they had swept in round two of the 2011 Stanley Cup playoffs just five months earlier. They recorded their first regular season success against the Tampa Bay Lightning on October 8, a 4–1 home victory against their 2011 Conference Final opponents. The Bruins closed out the month of October with a home-and-home series defeat at the hands of their bitter rivals, the Montreal Canadiens, en route to the worst start by a defending champion since the current playoff platform was adopted in 1994. The back-to-back losses at the hands of their hated rivals proved the catalyst to a resurgence that saw the team secure at least a point in every game through November, the first time the franchise went undefeated in regulation for an entire calendar month since January 1969. During this run, defending Vezina Trophy winner Tim Thomas posted a 9–0–0 record and earned First Star honors for the month.

With a win over the New York Islanders on March 31, the Bruins clinched an Eastern conference playoff berth. On April 1, the Bruins won the Northeast Division title by defeating the New York Rangers, 2–1.

The Bruins allowed only one shorthanded goal all the season, the lowest total of all 30 teams.

Playoffs

The Boston Bruins qualified for the Stanley Cup playoffs for the fifth consecutive season. The Bruins lost in the first round to the Washington Capitals in a seven-game series 4–3.

Standings

Schedule and results

Pre-season

Regular season

Playoffs

 Scorer of game-winning goal in italics

Player statistics

Skaters
Note: GP = Games played; G = Goals; A = Assists; Pts = Points; +/- = Plus-minus; PIM = Penalty minutes

†Denotes player spent time with another team before joining Bruins. Stats reflect time with the Bruins only.
‡Denotes player was traded mid-season. Stats reflect time with the Bruins only.
(G)Denotes goaltender.
Team PIM totals include bench infractions.

Goaltenders
Note: GPI = Games played in; MIN = Minutes played; GAA = Goals against average; W = Wins; L = Losses; OT = Overtime/shootout losses; SO = Shutouts; SA = Shots against; GA = Goals against; SV% = Save percentage

Awards and records

Awards

Milestones

Transactions 
The Bruins have been involved in the following transactions during the 2011–12 season, or the off-season between the previous season and this season.

Trades

Free agents signed

Free agents lost

Claimed via waivers

Lost via waivers

Lost via retirement

Player signings

Draft picks 

Boston's picks at the 2011 NHL Entry Draft in St. Paul, Minnesota.

Notes on draft picks
Boston acquired this pick as part of a trade on September 18, 2009, that sent Phil Kessel to Toronto.
Boston acquired this pick as part of a trade on October 18, 2009, that sent Chuck Kobasew to Minnesota in exchange for Craig Weller and Alexander Fallstrom.
Boston acquired this pick as the result of a trade on March 3, 2010, that sent Derek Morris to Phoenix.
 The Bruins' first-round pick, 30th overall, was traded to Toronto as a result of the trade that sent Tomas Kaberle to Boston.
 The Bruins' second-round pick, 61st overall, went to Ottawa as the result of the trade that sent Chris Kelly to Boston.
 The Bruins' third-round pick, 91st overall, went to Florida as the result of the trade that sent Nathan Horton and Gregory Campbell to Boston.
 The Bruins' seventh-round pick, 211th overall, went to Chicago as the result of the trade that sent a seventh-round pick in 2010 to Boston.

See also 
 2011–12 NHL season

References

Boston Bruins seasons
Boston Bruins
Boston Bruins
Boston Bruins
Boston Bruins
Bruins
Bruins